Nykvåg is a fishing village in Bø Municipality in Nordland county, Norway. It is one of the largest fishing villages on the west coast of the large island of Langøya in the Vesterålen archipelago. The village lies along the south side of Nykvåg bay and the neighboring village to the west is Vågen. Nykvåg is also known for its rich bird life in the Nykvåg/Nykan Nature Reserve adjacent to the village.

References

Bø, Nordland
Villages in Nordland
Fishing communities in Norway
Populated places of Arctic Norway